Sergio Mendes is a 1975 album by Sérgio Mendes (released in Brazil as I Believe and credited to Sergio Mendes and Brasil '77). This album features vocals by Bonnie Bowden and Sondra Catton.  Its the first of two self-titled albums from the artist.

Track listing
"Davy" (Bernard Ighner)
"I Believe (When I Fall In Love It Will Be Forever)" (Stevie Wonder, Yvonne Wright)
"All in Love Is Fair" (Stevie Wonder)
"Let Them Work It Out" (Thom Bell, Linda Creed)
"Here Comes The Sun" (George Harrison)
"If I Ever Lose This Heaven" (Leon Ware, Pam Sawyer)
"Lookin' for Another Pure Love" (Stevie Wonder)
"Someday We'll All Be Free" (Donny Hathaway)
"You Been Away Too Long" (Bernard Ighner)
"The Trouble with Hello Is Goodbye" (Dave Grusin, Alan Bergman, Marilyn Bergman)

Personnel/Credits
 Bass – Chuck Rainey
 Drums – Harvey Mason
 Engineer, Mixed By – Phil Schier
 Flute – Jerome Richardson
 Guitar – Bernard Ighner, David Amaro, David T. Walker, Dennis Budimir, Oscar Castro-Neves
 Percussion – Paulinho Da Costa (printed as "Paola Costa")
 Producers – Dave Grusin, Sérgio Mendes
 Vocals – Bonnie Bowden, Sondra Catton
 Recorded at Record Plant 
 Mixed at Westlake Audio

References

1975 albums
Sérgio Mendes albums
Albums produced by Dave Grusin
Albums arranged by Sérgio Mendes
Elektra Records albums